Zopowy  is a village located in Poland, in the Opole Voivodeship, Głubczyce County and Gmina Głubczyce.

External links
  Zopowy Website

Zopowy